Mount Clarence King, located in the Kings Canyon National Park, is named for Clarence King, who worked on the Whitney Survey, the first geological survey of California. King later became the first chief of the United States Geological Survey.

The Peak is located along King Spur, a sub-range of the California's Sierra Nevada. It is north of Mount Cotter, northeast of Gardiner Basin, and west of Sixty Lakes Basin and the John Muir Trail. The first ascent was recorded by painter and lithographer Bolton Brown.

References

External links 
 Mount Clarence King from Cotter (photo): Flickr
 

Mountains of Kings Canyon National Park
Mountains of Fresno County, California
Mountains of Northern California